Exeter Tutorial College is a small private school and sixth form located in Exeter, Devon, England. The school was founded in 1984 and withdrew from OFSTED in 2020. Prior to the OFSTED file closing, the school offers a selection of A level subjects taught over one year for students hoping to improve their existing results, as well as GCSEs and English for overseas students. The College plans to reopen in September 2021.

Reputation and external recognition 

As of the latest inspection in December 2019, the colleges Managerial team was rated 'inadequate' by Ofsted, and the College subsequently closed their OFSTED registration on 30 January 2020. Thereafter, the College successfully continued to teach their current cohort during the Covid crisis.

References

External links
 Exeter Tutorial College

Educational institutions established in 1984
Schools in Exeter
Defunct schools in Devon
1984 establishments in England
Educational institutions disestablished in 2020
2020 disestablishments in England